Kossuth County is a county in the U.S. state of Iowa. As of the 2020 census, the population was 14,828. The county seat is Algona.

History
Kossuth County was founded on January 15, 1851. It was named after Lajos Kossuth, Regent-President of Hungary who went into exile to America following the war of independence of Hungary from the Habsburg Dynasty. The county was enlarged northward in 1857 by the inclusion of the former Bancroft County. Crocker County was another county created out of the same area of Kossuth County as Bancroft County but was reverted due to not being larger than 432 square miles.

Geography
It is Iowa's largest county by area.

Major highways
 U.S. Highway 18
 U.S. Highway 169
 Iowa Highway 9
 Iowa Highway 15
 Iowa Highway 17

Adjacent counties
Martin County, Minnesota (north)
Faribault County, Minnesota (north)
Winnebago County (northeast)
Hancock County (southeast)
Humboldt County (south)
Palo Alto County (southwest)
Emmet County (northwest)

National protected area
 Union Slough National Wildlife Refuge

Demographics

2020 census
There were 7,216 housing units, of which 6,438 were occupied.

2010 census
There were 7,486 housing units, of which 6,697 were occupied.

2000 census

At the 2000 census there were 17,163 people, 6,974 households, and 4,791 families in the county. The population density was 18 people per square mile (7/km2). There were 7,605 housing units at an average density of 8 per square mile (3/km2).  The racial makeup of the county was 98.76% White, 0.11% Black or African American, 0.15% Native American, 0.35% Asian, 0.01% Pacific Islander, 0.29% from other races, and 0.34% from two or more races. 0.81%. were Hispanic or Latino of any race.

Of the 6,974 households, 30.90% had children under the age of 18 living with them, 60.40% were married couples living together, 5.80% had a female householder with no husband present, and 31.30% were non-families. 28.70% of households were one person and 15.50% were one person aged 65 or older. The average household size was 2.42 and the average family size was 2.98.

The age distribution was 25.80% under the age of 18, 6.10% from 18 to 24, 24.30% from 25 to 44, 23.60% from 45 to 64, and 20.10% 65 or older. The median age was 41 years. For every 100 females, there were 95.30 males. For every 100 females age 18 and over, there were 94.00 males.

The median household income was $34,562 and the median family income was $41,159. Males had a median income of $30,191 versus $20,184 for females. The per capita income for the county was $16,598. About 7.50% of families and 10.20% of the population were below the poverty line, including 12.40% of those under age 18 and 8.60% of those age 65 or over.

Communities

Cities

Algona (County seat)
Bancroft
Burt
Fenton
Lakota
Ledyard
Lone Rock
Lu Verne
Swea City
Titonka
Wesley
West Bend
Whittemore

Census-designated places
Irvington
Sexton
St. Benedict
St. Joseph

Townships

 Buffalo
 Burt
 Cresco
 Eagle
 Fenton
 Garfield
 German
 Grant
 Greenwood
 Harrison
 Hebron
 Irvington
 Ledyard
 Lincoln
 Lotts Creek
 Lu Verne
 Plum Creek
 Portland
 Prairie
 Ramsey
 Riverdale
 Seneca
 Sherman
 Springfield
 Swea
 Union
 Wesley
 Whittemore

Population ranking
The population ranking of the following table is based on the 2020 census of Kossuth County.

† county seat

Politics

See also

National Register of Historic Places listings in Kossuth County, Iowa

References

External links

County website

 
1851 establishments in Iowa
Iowa counties
Populated places established in 1851